Beaver Brook Station is a Canadian rural community in Northumberland County, New Brunswick.

History

Notable people

Max Aitken grew up in the nearby community of Newcastle, New Brunswick. In accepting his peerage, Max Aitken chose the name "Lord Beaverbrook" (note the spelling difference) in reference to this community, after initially considering the harder to pronounce "Lord Miramichi".

See also
List of communities in New Brunswick

References

Communities in Northumberland County, New Brunswick